The Central National Bank also known as the Dorothy I. Height Building, or Apex Building, is the national headquarters of the National Council of Negro Women. It is located at 633 Pennsylvania Avenue, Northwest, Washington, D.C., in the Penn Quarter neighborhood.

History
Built in 1860, it operated as the St. Marc Hotel.
It was purchased by the Central National Bank, and the west front was renovated in 1887, to the designs of architect Alfred B. Mullett.
In 1945, the ground floor was leased by the Apex Liquor store.
In 1984, it was renovated by Sears.

The Late Victorian-style Dorothy I. Height Building is listed on the National Register of Historic Places. In addition, the building is designated as a contributing property to the Pennsylvania Avenue National Historic Site and the Downtown Historic District.

Gallery

References

External links

Commercial buildings completed in 1860
Commercial buildings on the National Register of Historic Places in Washington, D.C.
Victorian architecture in Washington, D.C.
Individually listed contributing properties to historic districts on the National Register in Washington, D.C.
National Council of Negro Women